Universidad Iberoamericana León (IBERO León) is a private, Catholic, Jesuit university campus located in Leon, Guanajuato, Mexico, which was founded in 1978 as a campus of Universidad Iberoamericana to extend its reach to the state of Guanajuato and the Bajio region. It is now independently run from the Mexico City campus and it is part of the Mexican Jesuit University System.

Universidad Iberoamericana León is a private entity, governed by Promotion of Culture and Higher Education Bajio, AC, which provides instruction at all levels of education, both undergraduate and graduate degrees, fosters cultural and scientific activities, promotes scientific research and cultural and literary endeavors, and undertakes complementary activities.

Campus
34 acres of campus with 17.859 m2 of building space, 94 classrooms, 33 labs, and 8 workshops, besides sports facilities and technological park.

Academic programs

Department of Art and Design
Architecture
Product Design
Interactive Digital Design
Design and Visual Arts
Landscape Architecture
Architectural Interior
Photographic Design
Design, Analysis and Creation of Posts

Department of Basic Sciences
Nutrition and Food Science
Bionanotechnology Engineering 

Department of Law
Law degree
International relations
Master of Constitutional Law and Amparo(with Institute of Legal Research of UNAM)

Department of Social Sciences and Humanities
Communication
Psychology
Clinical Psychotherapy

Department of Economic and Administrative Sciences
Management and Entrepreneurship
Foreign Trade and International Logistics
Accounting and Financial Strategies
Tourism Development and Hospitality
Marketing and Advertising, Organizational Development and Innovation, Organizational Management, Strategic Marketing, International Logistics and Supply Chain, Management of Technological Innovation

Education department
Analysis and Development of Education, Virtual Design Master of Educational Projects, Ed.D.

Engineering department
Biomedical engineering, Civil Engineering, Industrial engineer, Mechanical and Electrical Engineering, Mechatronics Engineering, Micro and Nano Engineering in Electronics, Business and Systems Engineering, Engineering Logistics Processes

Graduate School
Master's degree: Constitutional Law, Virtual Educational Projects Design, Politics and Public Management, Environmental Sciences with Emphasys on Sustainability,  Clinic Nutrition, Clinic Psychotherapy, International Logistics and Supply Chain, Strategic Marketing, Technology Innovation Management, High Administration, Organizational Administration, Photographic Design, Architecture of Interiors, 
PhDs: Social Sciences, Complexity and Interdisciplinarity Doctorado en Ciencias Sociales, Complejidad e Interdisciplinareidad; Administration; Education.

See also
 List of Jesuit sites

References

External references 
 Sistema Universitario Jesuita
 Asociación Nacional de Universidades e Instituciones de Enseñanza Superior: ANUIES
 Federación de Instituciones Mexicanas Particulares de Educación Superior, A.C.
 Asociación de Colegios y Universidades Jesuitas en Norte América

Leon
Buildings and structures in León, Guanajuato
Jesuit universities and colleges in Mexico
Educational institutions established in 1978
1978 establishments in Mexico